The Jasper micropolitan statistical area, as defined by the United States Census Bureau, is an area consisting of two counties in southwestern Indiana, anchored by the city of Jasper. At the 2010 census, the Micropolitan area (μSA)  had a population of 54,734 up from a population of 52,511 in the  2000 census.

Counties

Communities

Cities

Towns

Unincorporated places

Townships

Dubois County

Pike County

Demographics
At the 2000 census, there were 52,511 people, 19,932 households and 14,419 families residing within the μSA. The racial makeup of the μSA was 97.92% White, 0.13% African American, 0.11% Native American, 0.18% Asian, 0.04% Pacific Islander, 1.17% from other races, and 0.45% from two or more races. Hispanic or Latino of any race were 2.24% of the population.

The median household income was $39,464, and the median family income was $45,881. Males had a median income of $32,226 versus $22,248 for females. The per capita income for the μSA was $18,221.

See also
Illinois–Indiana–Kentucky tri-state area
Indiana census statistical areas

References

 
Dubois County, Indiana
Pike County, Indiana
Jasper, Indiana